Ali Mollov (born 31 December 1970) is a Bulgarian wrestler. He competed in the men's Greco-Roman 97 kg at the 2000 Summer Olympics.

References

External links
 

1970 births
Living people
Bulgarian male sport wrestlers
Olympic wrestlers of Bulgaria
Wrestlers at the 2000 Summer Olympics
People from Troyan